Bloomfield Schools (also known as the Bloomfield School District) is a public school district based in Bloomfield, New Mexico, United States. The district covers a  area in eastern/southeastern San Juan County.

In addition to the majority of Bloomfield, the district also serves the communities of Angustura, Blanco, Nageezi, Turley, West Hammond, most of Navajo Dam, and a portion of Lee Acres. It also includes Huerfano.

Schools
Bloomfield High School 
Mesa Alta Junior High School
Blanco Elementary School
Naaba Ani Elementary School
Central Primary School
Charlie Y. Brown High School (Alternative)

Enrollment
2007-2008 School Year: 3,187 students
2006-2007 School Year: 3,179 students
2005-2006 School Year: 3,191 students
2004-2005 School Year: 3,250 students
2003-2004 School Year: 3,178 students
2002-2003 School Year: 3,280 students
2001-2002 School Year: 3,214 students
2000-2001 School Year: 3,252 students

Demographics
There were a total of 3,187 students enrolled in Bloomfield Schools during the 2007-2008 school year. The gender makeup of the district was 48.23% female and 51.77% male. The racial makeup of the district was 33.57% Hispanic, 33.04% White, 32.48% Native American, 0.56% African American, and 0.35% Asian/Pacific Islander.

See also
List of school districts in New Mexico

References

External links
Bloomfield Schools – Official site.

School districts in New Mexico
Education in San Juan County, New Mexico